The 1988 California Golden Bears football team was an American football team that represented the University of California, Berkeley in the Pacific-10 Conference (Pac-10) during the 1988 NCAA Division I-A football season. In their second year under head coach Bruce Snyder, the Golden Bears compiled a 5–5–1 record (1–5–1 against Pac-10 opponents), finished in last place in the Pac-10, and were outscored by their opponents by a combined total of 244 to 243.

The team's statistical leaders included Troy Taylor with 2,416 passing yards, Chris Richards with 729 rushing yards, and Darryl Ingram with 513 receiving yards.

Schedule

Personnel

Season summary

Pacific

at Oregon State

Kansas

San Jose State

at Washington State

UCLA

Temple

at Arizona

at USC

at Washington

Stanford

References

California
California Golden Bears football seasons
California Golden Bears football